Luminol (C8H7N3O2) is a chemical that exhibits chemiluminescence, with a blue glow, when mixed with an appropriate oxidizing agent. Luminol is a white-to-pale-yellow crystalline solid that is soluble in most polar organic solvents, but insoluble in water.

Forensic investigators use luminol to detect trace amounts of blood at crime scenes, as it reacts with the iron in hemoglobin. Biologists use it in cellular assays to detect copper, iron, cyanides, as well as specific proteins via western blotting.

When luminol is sprayed evenly across an area, trace amounts of an activating oxidant make the luminol emit a blue glow that can be seen in a darkened room. The glow only lasts about 30 seconds, but can be documented photographically. The glow is stronger in areas receiving more spray; the intensity of the glow does not indicate the amount of blood or other activator present.

Synthesis
Luminol is synthesized in a two-step process, beginning with 3-nitrophthalic acid.  First, hydrazine (N2H4) is heated with the 3-nitrophthalic acid in a high-boiling solvent such as triethylene glycol and glycerol.  An acyl substitution condensation reaction occurs, with loss of water, forming 3-nitrophthalhydrazide.  Reduction of the nitro group to an amino group with sodium dithionite (Na2S2O4), via a transient hydroxylamine intermediate, produces luminol.

The compound was first synthesized in Germany in 1902, but was not named "luminol" until 1934.

Chemiluminescence

To exhibit its luminescence, the luminol must be activated with an oxidant.  Usually, a solution containing hydrogen peroxide (H2O2) and hydroxide ions in water is the activator.  In the presence of a catalyst such as an iron or periodate compound, the hydrogen peroxide decomposes to form oxygen and water:

2 H2O2 →  + 2 H2O
H2O2 + KIO4 → KIO3 + O2 + H2O

Laboratory settings often use potassium ferricyanide or potassium periodate for the catalyst.  In the forensic detection of blood, the catalyst is the iron present in haemoglobin.  Enzymes in a variety of biological systems may also catalyse the decomposition of hydrogen peroxide.

The exact mechanism of luminol chemiluminescence is a complex multi-step reaction, especially in aqueous conditions. A recent theoretical investigation has been able to elucidate the reaction cascade as shown below. Luminol is first deprotonated in basic conditions, then oxidized to the anionic radical. Which in turn has two paths available to give the key intermediate α-hydroxy- peroxide. After cyclization to the endoperoxide, the mono-anion will undergo decomposition without luminescence, if the pH is too low (< 8.2) for a second deprotonation. The endoperoxide dianion, however can give the retro-Diels-Alder product: 1,2-dioxane-3,6-dione dianion. And after chemiexcitation by two single-electron-transfers (SET) gives 3-aminophthalate dianion in its first singlet excited-state (S1). This highly instable molecule relaxes to the ground state, thereby emitting light of around 425 nm wavelength (purple-blue), the so-called chemiluminescence.

Use in criminal investigation

History
In 1928, German chemist H. O. Albrecht found that blood, among other substances, enhanced the luminescence of luminol in an alkaline solution of hydrogen peroxide.  In 1936, Karl Gleu and Karl Pfannstiel confirmed this enhancement in the presence of haematin, a component of blood.  In 1937, German forensic scientist Walter Specht made extensive studies of luminol's application to the detection of blood at crime scenes.  In 1939, San Francisco pathologists Frederick Proescher and A. M. Moody made three important observations about luminol:
 although the test is presumptive, large areas of suspected material can be examined rapidly;
 dried and decomposed blood gave a stronger and more lasting reaction than fresh blood; and
 if the luminescence disappears, it may be reproduced by the application of a fresh luminol-hydrogen peroxide solution; dried bloodstains may thus be made luminescent repeatedly.

Theory
Crime scene investigators use luminol to find traces of blood, even if someone has cleaned or removed it. The investigator sprays a solution of luminol and the oxidant. The iron in blood catalyses the luminescence.  The amount of catalyst necessary to cause the reaction is very small relative to the amount of luminol, allowing detection of even trace amounts of blood. The blue glow lasts for about 30 seconds per application.  Detecting the glow requires a fairly dark room.  Any glow detected may be documented by a long-exposure photograph.

Drawbacks
Luminol's use in a crime scene investigation is somewhat hampered by the fact that it reacts to iron- and copper-containing compounds, bleaches, horseradish, fecal matter, or cigarette smoke residue.
Application of luminol to a piece of evidence may prevent other tests from being performed on it; however DNA has been successfully extracted from samples exposed to luminol.

Related molecules
 Luminol: 5-amino-2,3-dihydro-1,4-phthalazinedione ; 3-amino-phthalhydrazide ; 1,4-phthalazinedione, 5-amino-2,3-dihydro ; CAS: [521-31-3] C8H7N3O2 – MW: 177.16λabs (in 0.1 N NaOH) λmax 1 : 347 nm & λmax 2 : 300 nm; EC (at λmax 1): 7650 L/mol × cm λabs / λem (MeOH): 355/413 nm
 Luminol, sodium salt: sodium 3-amino-phthalhydrazide; CAS: [20666-12-0] C8H6N3O2Na – MW: 199.12
 Luminol hemihydrate: a hydrate of sodium 3-amino-phthalhydrazide; CAS: [206658-90-4] C8H6N3O2Na – MW: 217.16
 Luminol hydrochloride: 3-amino-phthalhydrazide hydrochloride; CAS: [74165-64-3] C8H7N3O2 · HCl  MW: 213.62
 Isoluminol: 4-aminophthalhydrazide; CAS: [3682-14-1]C8H7N3O2 – MW: 117.16 (Xi)
 Isoluminol monohydrate: 4-aminophthalhydrazide monohydrate C8H7N3O2 – MW: 195.15
 Isoluminol ABEI: 4-aminophthalhydrazide monohydrate; CAS: [66612-29-1]

See also
 Fluorescein
 Diphenyl oxalate

References

External links

 HowStuffWorks "How Luminol Works"
 Luminol demonstration in Turin

Aromatic amines
Chemical tests
Forensic chemicals
Hydrazides
Phthalazines
Lactams
Chemiluminescence